Olimpia Cataramă (born 25 October 1940) is a Romanian athlete. She competed in the women's discus throw at the 1964 Summer Olympics and the 1968 Summer Olympics.

References

1940 births
Living people
Athletes (track and field) at the 1964 Summer Olympics
Athletes (track and field) at the 1968 Summer Olympics
Romanian female discus throwers
Olympic athletes of Romania
Place of birth missing (living people)